Presentation Brothers College (PBC Cork) (colloquially known as Pres) is a Catholic, boys, private fee-paying secondary school in Cork, Ireland. Presentation Brothers College is currently ranked as the number one boys secondary school in Ireland and regularly places first in the annual top performing schools table rankings conducted by The Irish Times.

History 
The college was founded by the Presentation Brothers in 1878, in the South Mall. Soon afterwards it moved to the Grand Parade and, in 1887, to the Western Road. In 1985, the college moved to a new building on the Mardyke on the site of the college's rugby facilities; the Western Road premises is now owned and used by UCC. The college has developed new rugby facilities at Dennehy's Cross and uses Shandon Boat Club for rowing.

In 1969, Jerome Kelly returned home from missionary work in the West Indies and was appointed principal of the college. He organised a series of workshops, in which the students of Presentation College were encouraged to think globally and act locally:

The result was the founding of the charity Students Harness Aid for the Relief of the Elderly in 1970. SHARE expanded and now includes pupils from other secondary schools in Cork city.

In 2005, the Preslink organisation was founded in the school; a group of junior students whose stated aim is to forge links with other Presentation Brothers communities. In 2006, the organisation received an "Edmund Rice Award", which recognises groups that work to improve the lives of others.

In November 2009, ownership of the school, along with seven other Presentation Brothers schools in Ireland, was handed over to a group of lay trustees

Curriculum 

The school offers both the Junior and Leaving Certificate cycles. It has been named the best boys' secondary school outside Dublin by the Irish Examiner. The current curriculum teaches first years religion; Irish as L2; English as L1; mathematics; Latin; French as L2; German as L2; science; business studies; history ; geography; CSPE; SPHE; art; and physical education. In second year, the students may choose to drop two of the L2 foreign languages. Unusually for a private school, streaming is not used until third year.

After completing the Junior Certificate, the college requires students to complete a mandatory Transition Year. In fifth year, students begin the Leaving Cert cycle. At the Leaving Certificate level, the college offers a wide range of courses. Irish as L2, English L1 and mathematics are compulsory. One language must be taken from French as L2, German as L2 and Latin. Any three optional subjects may be taken from the sciences (physics, chemistry, biology), the businesses (business studies, accounting, economics), history, art, applied mathematics, geography, politics and society and religion.

Rugby 
The college sport is rugby union. , the college has won 31 Senior Schools Cups and 31 Junior Schools Cups  respectively, and has produced 22 Irish Rugby Internationals. In 2007, the school won both the Senior Schools Cup and the Junior Schools Cup (the first time they had won both in the same year since 1995, when Ronan O'Gara was the Senior Captain). Six players have played for the Lions - Tom Kiernan (1962 & Captain in 1968 ), Jerry Walsh (1966), Michael Kiernan (1983), Ronan O'Gara (2001, 2005 & 2009), Simon Zebo (2013) and Peter O'Mahony (2017).

2014 
In March, PBC won the Junior Schools Cup for the first time in five years in a 17–12 win over Crescent.

2017
The school participates in a number of Munster under-age School-Boy competitions: McCarthy Cup A, B & B Schools (U-15), The Junior Schools Cup (U-16), The Kidney Cup (Junior B), The Bowen Shield & B Schools (U-18), The Barry Cup (Senior B), and The Senior Schools Cup (U-19). Pres have won every cup at some point and several teams have won every competition.

The school playing fields are located at Dennehy's Cross, Wilton. There are 4 pitches, one walled and one flood-lit.

Extra-curricular activities and sport

Drama 
The college drama society performs one production of a dramatic play annually. This is very often the play studied by Leaving Cert students of that academic year. Recent productions have included Sive (2013) and All My Sons (2014).

Sciences 
In 2012 three students were invited to partake in the European Science and Maths Olympiad, based on their Junior Certificate results in Maths and Science. These students participated in the Olympiad in DCU.
In 2004, the Pres team won the first Cork Robotics Competition for Schools, which was launched by the Cork Electronics Industry Association (CEIA) at the National Software Centre in Mahon Point.

Rowing 

PBC has had many students who have been members of the various Cork rowing clubs since 1890, some of whom have won Irish Championships with these clubs but never as Pres College Rowing Club. In 1985 Presentation College Rowing Club was registered officially for the first time with the Irish Amateur Rowing Union and began rowing out of Shandon Boat Club on the Marina. The equipment used was bought second-hand from Dungarvan Rowing Club. In its existence to date, the club has been a tenant of both Cork Boat Club and Lee Rowing Club and has recently returned to Shandon Boat Club.

The club now owns 3 eights, 4 fours, 3 pairs and 7 singles along with a full selection of blades, coaching launches and a boat trailer.

Other sports 
Other sports played at the college include basketball, cricket, GAA, soccer and golf. The school has won the GAA Lord Mayor's Cup five times in the last six years. The school golf team has also won the Cork County Championship consecutively in 2006 and 2007. PBC reached the All-Ireland basketball U-16s cup final for the first time in 2009 and defeated St. Columbs college from Derry to win PBC's first ever All-Ireland. In the last number of years, the college has won numerous soccer titles. These include Cork Cups at First Year, Minor, Junior and Senior level. In February 2015, PBC won the Munster Schools Senior Cup.

Selected alumni

Business 
 Ben Dunne, businessman

Law 
Liam McKechnie, Justice of the Supreme Court of Ireland

Media 
 Michael Clifford, author and investigative journalist 
 Cathal Coughlan, singer, songwriter and keyboard player in the bands The Fatima Mansions and Microdisney
 George Hook, journalist
 Fergal Keane, BBC television journalist/author
 David Marcus, novelist and literary editor
 Cillian Murphy, actor
 Seán Ó Faoláin, author and short story writer
 Eoghan Harris

Politics 
 Daniel Corkery, writer, Professor of English at UCC and Senator.
 Barry Desmond, former Minister for Health and Minister for Social Welfare.
 Fergus Finlay, political adviser, author and journalist.
 Gene Fitzgerald, TD, Minister for Labour, Minister for the Public Service and Minister for Finance.
 Gerald Goldberg, solicitor and first Jewish Lord Mayor of Cork.
 Eoghan Harris,  former Senator (Ireland) and columnist
 Michael O'Leary, former Tánaiste, former leader of the Labour Party, former Fine Gael TD.

Rugby 
 Michael Bradley capped 40 times for Ireland Rugby Union, 15 times as captain, current coach at Edinburgh
 Marney Cunningham, former Irish Rugby Union International and catholic priest
Alex Kendellan
 Declan Kidney, former head coach of the Irish national rugby team and former head coach of the Munster rugby team 
 Mike Kiernan, former Irish Rugby Union International and British and Irish Lions team member
 Tom Kiernan, Irish Rugby Union International and British and Irish Lions team member.
 Mick O'Driscoll, former Irish Rugby Union International.
 Ronan O'Gara, former Irish  Rugby Union International and British and Irish Lions team member.
 Peter O'Mahony, current Irish Rugby Union International.
 Niall Scannell, current Munster Rugby squad member
 Rory Scannell, current Munster Rugby squad member
 Frankie Sheahan, former Irish Rugby Union International.
 Peter Stringer, former Irish Rugby Union International.
 Jerry Walsh, former Irish Rugby Union International and British and Irish Lions team member
 Simon Zebo, current Munster Rugby squad member

Other sport 
 Alan Bennett, current Cork City FC and Ireland soccer player
 John Browne, holder of three All-Ireland Hurling medals (1999, 2004 & 2005)
 Noel Cantwell, former Irish Football Captain, and captain of the 1963 FA Cup winners.
 Brian Clifford, Swimmer, competed in the men's 1500 metre freestyle at the 1972 Summer Olympic Games. Brian was still a pupil at Pres at the time
 Eoin Cotter Gaelic footballer, All-Ireland Football medal winner 2010
 Dick Fitzgerald Gaelic footballer & Winner of five All-Ireland Football medals, Fitzgerald Stadium in Kerry is named after him
 Caoimhín Kelleher, Liverpool FC goalkeeper
 Brian Lenihan, former Cork City FC, Hull City FC and Ireland soccer player
 Jack Short, cricketer for Ireland from 1974–1984

Notable staff 
 Jim Corr, former TD and former Lord Mayor of Cork.
 Micheál Martin, Taoiseach
 Pádraig Ó Caoimh, Irish soldier and long-time administrator of the Gaelic Athletic Association (GAA). Páirc Uí Chaoimh, the home of the Cork GAA, is named after him.
 William Wall, novelist, poet and short story
 Fran Keane, Head coach of Rowing Ireland's men's heavyweight program.

References

External links 
 Irish Amateur Rowing Union 
 PBC Cork homepage
 Pres Debating homepage
 CEIA Robotics Competition

Boys' schools in the Republic of Ireland
Secondary schools in County Cork
Educational institutions established in 1878
Sport in County Cork
Presentation Brothers schools
Private schools in the Republic of Ireland
Education in Cork (city)
1878 establishments in Ireland